Matoi (纏, まとい) can be a given name or a surname.

Fictional characters
, Main character from Kill la Kill
, a character from Z/X
, a character from the Tatsumi family in Kyuukyuu Sentai GoGoFive
, a character from Sayonara, Zetsubou-Sensei
, Main character from Matoi the Sacred Slayer

 
Japanese unisex given names
Japanese-language surnames